Cydel Charles Young (born September 15, 1984), known professionally as CyHi the Prynce, is an American rapper and singer. In 2009, Young signed his first major-label contract with Konvict Muzik, with the backing of Def Jam Recordings. In 2010, he began to gain more attention with his work alongside fellow American rapper Kanye West. Young went on to appear on West's highly acclaimed album, My Beautiful Dark Twisted Fantasy (2010) and has released nine mixtapes, with the latest being BHP II: NAACP (2015), a conscious hip hop concept mixtape about the history of black people in America and the sequel to Black Hystori Project, released in February 2014. He was released from his Def Jam contract in August 2015. In November 2017, he released his debut album, No Dope on Sundays, under Sony Music, following years of label disputes and series of mixtapes spanning his career.

Biography

1985–2011: Early life and career beginnings
Growing up in Georgia, Young played various sports including football, basketball, and track and field; in addition to having sung in school choirs and participated in school plays and dances. He was raised Baptist by strict parents, who didn't allow him to listen to hip hop music as a youth.  However, Young cites his parents' methods as a foundation upon which he could build himself in character, especially growing up in the area that he was.

In 2009, Young signed a recording contract with Akon's Konvict Muzik label imprint, under the aegis of Def Jam Recordings. Young first gained major attention in 2010 when he received a co-sign from fellow American rapper and hip hop mogul Kanye West. Young reports that American singer Beyoncé, a friend of West and the wife of his mentor, Jay-Z, convinced Kanye West to sign him to his GOOD Music imprint. This culminated in Young's inclusion on West's weekly free music giveaway GOOD Fridays, and his fifth studio album My Beautiful Dark Twisted Fantasy (2010).

Young recorded his second mixtape, Royal Flush II, with producer CPK, and planned to work further with previous collaborators the J.U.S.T.I.C.E. League, No I.D. and Kanye West, as well as DJ Toomp, The Alchemist and Just Blaze. Young released his third mixtape, Jack of All Trades, later in 2011, which announced the title of his debut studio album to be Hardway Musical.

2012: Cruel Summer
Young appeared on GOOD Music's compilation album Cruel Summer, released September 18, 2012. Young was ultimately featured on two tracks, including: "The Morning", along with Raekwon, Common, Pusha T, 2 Chainz, Kid Cudi, and D'banj, as well as "Sin City", alongside John Legend, Teyana Taylor, Malik Yusef, and Travis Scott. On January 29, 2013, he released his fifth mixtape, Ivy League: Kick Back. The tape features guest appearances from 2 Chainz, B.o.B, Travis Porter, Yelawolf, Childish Gambino, Trae Tha Truth and Bobby Valentino among others. Despite not being featured on Kanye West's Yeezus album, Young has writing credits on all but one of the album's songs. CyHi continued to prepare his debut studio album Hardway Musical for release.

2015–present: Label confusion and L.I.O.N.
As of August 2015, CyHi's album had yet to receive a release date. Frustrated with his situation and having been dropped from Def Jam Recordings, he released a diss track called "Elephant in the Room", aimed toward G.O.O.D. Music, its owner Kanye West, Pusha T and Teyana Taylor. On the track, he addresses his album delays and even threatens Kanye: "While you're in your little Lambo on Sunset, I'm riding with a gun next to me and it sounds like a little boy playing with a drum set / And, it holds a hundred rounds 'cause when you come around, niggas quick to gun you down."

CyHi would later clarify that the track was not in fact a diss. Rather it was similar to the light-hearted 'insults' that Eminem would inflict on Dr. Dre. An upcoming album to be titled L.I.O.N. was announced amid this increase in media attention, still containing the G.O.O.D. Music imprint's logo, further indicating that CyHi was still with the label, and on good terms.

His debut album, No Dope on Sundays, was released on November 17, 2017. It was preceded by the singles "Movin' Around" featuring Schoolboy Q and "Dat Side" featuring Kanye West.

On February 14, 2021, CyHi revealed on Instagram that he had survived an assassination attempt. As he was driving on an Atlanta highway, his car was reportedly shot up, causing it to flip over. After his car hit a pole and crashed into a tree, the suspect continued to shoot the car before fleeing the scene.

Discography

Studio albums
 No Dope on Sundays (2017)

Mixtapes
 Royal Flush (2010)
 Royal Flush 2 (2011)
 Jack of All Trades (2011)
 Ivy League Club (2012)
 Ivy League: Kick Back (2013)
 Black Hystori Project (2014)
 Black Hystori Project 2: N.A.A.C.P. (2015)

Awards and nominations

Grammy Awards (as songwriter)

References

External links
 Reverbnation.com
 Nanci O Is Hip Hop Interview With CyHi The Prynce

1984 births
Living people
African-American male rappers
Southern hip hop musicians
GOOD Music artists
Def Jam Recordings artists
21st-century American rappers
21st-century American male musicians
21st-century African-American musicians
20th-century African-American people